Boomslang may refer to several articles. The word boom (tree) comes from Afrikaans and in that language does not rhyme with doom. It is closer to boooo-um:

 Boomslang, a species of arboreal snake from Africa.
 Boomslang (album), the first full-length album by Johnny Marr and the Healers
 Boomslang (comics), a supervillain in the Marvel comics universe, a member of the Serpent Society
 Boomslang (mouse), a computer gaming peripheral made by Razer USA Ltd
 Boomslang (music festival), an annual WRFL-sponsored music festival in Lexington, Kentucky.